Super Champion was a French brand of high quality bicycle rims for competition and road use. Super Champion was eventually purchased by tire manufacturer Wolber. In the 1980s, Super Champion's line of rims included:

Super Champion also sold a line of rims by the name of Mixte (580g), capable of taking either a clincher tire or a sew up.

References
http://www.classicrendezvous.com/France/S_Champion_advert.htm
http://www.sheldonbrown.com/velos.html
http://www.velobase.com/ViewSingleComponent.aspx?ID=bb3df84a-54cc-47de-b576-ac7112f98838

Bicycle wheels